Yimnashana is a genus of longhorn beetles of the subfamily Lamiinae, containing the following species:

 Yimnashana ceylonica Breuning, 1961
 Yimnashana denticulata Gressitt, 1937
 Yimnashana lungtauensis Gressitt, 1951
 Yimnashana theae Gressitt, 1951
 Yimnashana wakaharai Yamasako, Hasegawa & Ohbayashi, 2012

References

Gyaritini